Christiana Historic District is a national historic district located at Christiana, New Castle County, Delaware.  It encompasses nine contributing buildings. They include: Brinkle-Maxwell House (c. 1786), Jones Mansion House Lot (c. 1752), Christiana Presbyterian Church (1757), Joel Lewis House (c. 1799), Christiana Methodist Episcopal Church (1858), Christiana Inn (c. 1770), Hillis Mansion House ( c.1750)and Shannon Hotel.

It was listed on the National Register of Historic Places in 1974.

References

Houses on the National Register of Historic Places in Delaware
Historic districts on the National Register of Historic Places in Delaware
Houses in New Castle County, Delaware
Historic districts in New Castle County, Delaware
National Register of Historic Places in New Castle County, Delaware